No Name ( was a Montenegrin boyband, best known for the controversies surrounding their participation in the national pre-selection for the Eurovision Song Contest. The group made its debut in 2005, with the song "Zauvijek moja" (Forever Mine) (Milan Perić/Slaven Knezović), winning the 2005 Europjesma and thus representing Serbia and Montenegro in the Eurovision Song Contest 2005. The group fared 7th in the ESC with a total of 137 points, succeeding in obtaining the straight pass to the final of the Eurovision Song Contest 2006 for Serbia and Montenegro.
It was founded on 19 November 2003.

In November 2006, bassist Marko Perić left the group for an unknown reason.

The group disbanded in 2008.

Members
Marko Perić - (2003–2006) (bass guitar)
Marko Prentić (vocal, solo guitar)
Danijel Alibabić (vocal)
Branko Nedović (keyboards)
Dragoljub Purlija (drums)
Bojan Jovović (keyboards, back vocal).

Controversies
In 2005, as complete outsiders but with a song which has strong national (Montenegrin) identity, they got most of the votes from the jury appointed by the RTCG, causing a stir among the Serbian and Montenegrin followers of the Eurovision Song Contest.

Again in March 2006, they participated in Montevizija 2006, the Montenegrin semi-final, and finished 2nd, going on to win in the final Europjesma with "Moja ljubavi". The jury appointed by the RTCG failed to award any points to the Serbian-based group Flamingosi, who were, by some, declared winners even before the competition others favouring No Name. New arrangement of the song and victory of No Name came just in time for the campaign for Montenegrin independence, which started that year. The Serbian TV station decided to pull out and therefore No Name could not represent the country in Athens.

Singles 
 Za Tebe i Mene (Sunčane Skale 2004 - 2nd place)
 Budućnost (FK Budućnost Podgorica supporters' song)
 Zauvijek moja (Eurovision Song Contest 2005 - 7th place)
 Moja ljubavi (Evropesma 2006 - 1st place, withdrawn from Eurovision)
 Forever Mine
 Kad Budemo Zajedno (Music Festival Budva 2006)
 Moja Mala (duet with Macedonian singer Bojana)
 Postelja od Leda (Music Festival Budva 2007 - 2nd place)
 Kad Kažeš Ne (Radijski Festival 2007)
 Pronađi me

See also 
 Europjesma
 Montevizija
 Serbia and Montenegro in the Eurovision Song Contest
 Radio Television of Montenegro
 Eurovision Song Contest

External links 
Serbia and Montenegro in pop song row - BBC News article about events following the disputed Eurovision submission
http://www.montenegrina.net/pages/pages1/muzika/upotreba_eurosonga_u_politicke_svrhe_z_milovic.htm

Eurovision Song Contest entrants for Serbia and Montenegro
Eurovision Song Contest entrants of 2005
Montenegrin boy bands
Musical groups disestablished in 2008